Commercials GAA was a Limerick Gaelic Athletic Association club which folded around 1990.

History

Commercials were founded in 1884 by shop assistants working in the city. Many of its members came from County Limerick and surrounding counties. In the late 19th century, many shopworkers would have come from smallholder families as shopwork was one of the few occupations open to rural Catholics with some education who had no land to inherit. Shopworkers were very active in nationalist and cultural organisations like the IRB, the Gaelic League and the GAA.

Commercials were Limerick's dominant football team in the early days of the GAA, and won 16 county senior championships between 1887 and 1927. They won the first football All Ireland in 1887 defeating Young Irelands of Dundalk. 
The Limerick Commercials team that beat Dundalk Young Irelands in the 1887 All-Ireland football final (played on a field known as the "Big Bank" in Clonskeagh C. Dublin on 29 April 1888) was: Denis Corbett (goalkeeper and captain), Timothy Fitzgibbon, William Gunning, Richard Breen, John Hyland, Thomas McNamara, William J Spain (winner of an All-Ireland hurling medal with Dublin in 1889), Patrick J Corbett, Michael Slattery, Jeremiah R Kennedy, Michael Casey, James Mulqueen, Malachi O'Brien, Patrick Kelly, Timothy Kennedy, Philip Keating, William Cleary, Robert Normoyle, Patrick S Reeves, Thomas Keating, Thomas McMahon. Others to play for the team in previous rounds were Ned Nicholas, Edward Casey, Richard O'Brien, James Purcell, Thomas McLoughlin and Thomas Lynch. After trailing by 0-3 to 0-1 to the Louthmen's clever hand work at half-time, their fine defence and spirited rushes carried them to victory on a score of 1-4 to 0-3.

Commercials added a second All Ireland title in 1896 defeating another Young Irelands from Dublin. However, their fortunes waned with the rise of the city's parish-based teams like Treaty Sarsfields, Claughaun and Saint Patrick's. They won a number of City Division junior football titles during the 1950s and appeared in a final for the last time in 1961. Young Irelands and Commercials joined in the 1950s as sister clubs with Young Irelands running the hurling and Commercials the football but with no field of their own and a hit and miss underage structure, they struggled to survive until they finally folded up around 1990.

Roll of honour

 Limerick Senior Football Championship- 1887, 1888, 1889, 1895, 1896, 1897, 1898, 1899, 1902, 1904, 1905, 1910, 1911, 1919, 1920, 1927
 Limerick Junior Hurling Championship- 1908, 1910, 1911
 City Junior Football Championship- 1952,1953, 1954
 Limerick Juvenile Football Championship- 1969
 City Juvenile Football Championship- 1969

Gaelic games clubs in County Limerick
Gaelic football clubs in County Limerick